Nicaragua competed at the 2017 World Championships in Athletics in London, United Kingdom from 4–13 August 2017.

Results

Men
Track and road events

References

Nations at the 2017 World Championships in Athletics
World Championships in Athletics
Nicaragua at the World Championships in Athletics